Epping station may refer to:
 Epping railway station, Melbourne, a station on the Mernda line on the Metropolitan train network in Melbourne, Victoria, Australia
 Epping railway station, Sydney, a station on the T9 Northern Line on the Sydney Trains network and on the Sydney Metro in Sydney, New South Wales, Australia
 Epping tube station, the terminus of the London Underground Central line in Essex, United Kingdom
 Epping Glade railway station, a planned station on the Epping Ongar heritage railway in Essex, United Kingdom